The FIBA EuroBasket All-time leading scorers in total points scored are the basketball players with the most total points scored in the FIBA EuroBasket.

All-time leading scorers in total points scored
Counting all games played through the end of EuroBasket 2017

See also 
 FIBA EuroBasket
 FIBA EuroBasket MVP
 FIBA EuroBasket All-Tournament Team
 FIBA EuroBasket All-Time leaders in games played
 FIBA World Cup
 FIBA World Cup Records
 FIBA Basketball World Cup Most Valuable Player
 FIBA Basketball World Cup All-Tournament Team
 FIBA's 50 Greatest Players (1991)

External links 
 
 

EuroBasket